Major William Blakeney (1735 – 2 November 1804) was an Irish British Army officer and politician.

He was born the son of Irish MP John Blakeney  and  Grace  Perrse, and was the brother of Robert, John and Theophilus Blakeney.

As a soldier in the British Army William Blakeney fought in the German War at the Battle of Rheinberg (1758), during which he was wounded and at the Battle of Minden (1759), when he was again wounded. As Captain Blakeney he then fought in the American War of Independence at the Battle of Bunker Hill (1775), where he was yet again severely wounded. He retired at the rank of Major in 1779.

He sat in the Irish House of Commons for Athenry from 1781 to 1783 and again from 1790 to 1800.

He married Sarah Shields, daughter of Samuel Shields, on 6 September 1770 and was the father of Edward Blakeney.

References

 
 http://thepeerage.com/p27666.htm#i276659

1735 births
1804 deaths
19th-century Irish people
Irish soldiers in the British Army
Irish MPs 1776–1783
Irish MPs 1790–1797
Irish MPs 1798–1800
Politicians from County Galway
Royal Welch Fusiliers officers
British Army personnel of the Seven Years' War
British Army personnel of the American Revolutionary War
Members of the Parliament of Ireland (pre-1801) for County Galway constituencies